The Springfield Terminal railroad bridge in Deerfield, Massachusetts, is a three-span deck-truss bridge which crosses the Connecticut River.

History 

The railroad crossing at this location dates to 1850 when a branch of the Fitchburg Railroad opened from Grout's Corner west to Greenfield. This line would later connect to the Hoosac Tunnel, which opened to rail traffic in 1875.

The bridge carries rail traffic in and out of the former Boston & Maine Railroad yard at East Deerfield. The bridge, owned by Pan Am Railways, is at the east end of the yard.

See also 
 List of crossings of the Connecticut River

References 

 USGS Greenfield, Massachusetts Quadrangle Map, September 1894, reprinted 1918. Historic USGS Maps of New England & New York , University of New Hampshire Library Digital Collections Initiative.

External links 
 

Bridges over the Connecticut River
Railroad bridges in Massachusetts
Bridges completed in 1850
Bridges in Franklin County, Massachusetts
Wrought iron bridges in the United States
Iron bridges in the United States